

Mehikoorma Lighthouse (Estonian: Mehikoorma tuletorn) is a lighthouse located on the western coast, in the southern part of Lake Peipus, Räpina Parish, in Põlva County, in Estonia. The lighthouse was built in 1906, from a wooden structure which was replaced with ferroconcrete in 1938. The lighthouse is painted solely in white.

See also 

 List of lighthouses in Estonia

References

External links 
 

Lighthouses completed in 1906
Resort architecture in Estonia
Lighthouses in Estonia
Räpina Parish
Buildings and structures in Põlva County
1906 establishments in the Russian Empire